Clement Adebooye (born ) is a Nigerian professor of  plant physiology. He is the 4th substantive vice chancellor of the Osun State University.

Achievements 
With a more than 26-year academic career, Prof. Adebooye has held a variety of positions, including Deputy Vice-Chancellor, Provost/Dean, Director, and Head of Department at UNIOSUN.

He was the  most senior full-time professor at Obafemi Awolowo University in the Department of Crop Production and Protection prior to his appointment.

He had previously held positions as the Regional Project Coordinator for the Government of Canada Projects in West Africa, Secretary-General of the African-German Network Excellence in Science (AGNES), and Scientist Ambassador for the German Government Humboldt Foundation.

References

See also 

 List of vice chancellors in Nigeria
 University of Osun

Living people
Nigerian scientists
1966 births
Vice-Chancellors of Nigerian universities
People from Osun State
Plant physiologists